Salome Chachua ( Salome Ch’ach’ua, born 23 June 1990) is a Georgian ballroom and Latin dancer and choreographer.

Career 
Chachua is a seven-time Georgian Latin dancing champion. From 2004 to 2006, Chachua represented Georgia in several Junior World dance competitions. She was at one time ranked 57th in WDC Professional Latin and 73rd in WDSF RLS Latin.

So You Think You Can Dance 
In 2016, Chachua was a judge on the Georgian version of the dance competition show So You Think You Can Dance.

Dancing with the Stars

Georgia 
Between 2012 and 2018, Chachua appeared as a professional dancer on seven non-consecutive seasons of the Georgian version of Dancing with the Stars, reaching the final with her celebrity partners three separate times.

Ireland 
On 22 December 2021, Chachua was announced as one of the new professionals to join the fifth series of the Irish version of Dancing with the Stars. Her partner was rugby union player, Jordan Conroy. Chachua and Conroy performed for the first time on the second week of the show scoring one of the highest scores of the week. They reached the finals, finishing as runners-up behind Nina Carberry and Pasquale La Rocca, alongside Ellen Keane and Stephen Vincent and Erica-Cody and Denys Samson.

Chachua returned for the sixth series in 2023, partnered with former Dublin GAA footballer, Paul Brogan. They were the third couple to be eliminated from the competition.

Series 5 – with celebrity partner Jordan Conroy

In week 10, Chachua tested positive for COVID-19, so her partner, Jordan Conroy danced with Emily Barker.

Series 6 – with celebrity partner Paul Brogan

References 

1990 births
Living people
Ballroom dancers